Schlüßlberg is a municipality in the district of Grieskirchen in the Austrian state of Upper Austria.

Geography
Schlüßlberg lies in the Hausruckviertel. About 15 percent of the municipality is forest, and 74 percent is farmland.

References

Cities and towns in Grieskirchen District